Cadiz is an unincorporated community in Hardin County, Illinois, United States. Cadiz is north of Cave-in-Rock.

References

Unincorporated communities in Hardin County, Illinois
Unincorporated communities in Illinois